Zhang Tiangang (born 20 February 1985) is a Chinese former footballer.

Career statistics

Club

Notes

References

1985 births
Living people
Chinese footballers
Association football forwards
Chinese Super League players
Shanghai Shenxin F.C. players